"The Death of Captain America" is an eighteen-issue Captain America story arc written by Ed Brubaker with art by Steve Epting and published by Marvel Comics. The arc first appears in Captain America (vol. 5) #25–30. The first issue of the story arc, Captain America #25, was the highest selling comic for the month of its release. The story arc had wide-sweeping effects throughout the Marvel Universe and was accompanied by the miniseries Fallen Son: The Death of Captain America.

Plot

In the aftermath of Civil War, Captain America is taken into S.H.I.E.L.D. custody where he is assassinated per the order of the Red Skull. Crossbones snipes at him while Sharon Carter (Agent 13; Cap's girlfriend), who has been brainwashed by Doctor Faustus, posing as a S.H.I.E.L.D. psychiatrist, delivers the killing shot. Overwhelmed with guilt, S.H.I.E.L.D. director Tony Stark and Black Widow hunt Captain America's murderers. Falcon, Captain America's old partner, follows his own leads to find the killers. Meanwhile, Bucky Barnes decides to kill Tony Stark, blaming him for Captain America's death.

After receiving a letter written by Steve Rogers telling him that the Captain America legacy should continue, and look out for Bucky, Stark shows Bucky Barnes the letter and proposes to make him the new Captain America. Bucky agrees on the condition that he can be an independent agent who doesn't answer to Stark, S.H.I.E.L.D., or the Initiative. The Red Skull fakes the death of Aleksander Lukin, whose mind he inhabits, begins using Kronas Corporation's vast holdings to economically cripple the United States, before having S.H.I.E.L.D. agents brainwashed by Doctor Faustus open fire on crowds of protesters in front of the White House. The Red Skull continues his assault by engineering a riot via the placing of Kronas security troops and utilizing drugged water in a protest on the Lincoln Memorial. The Skull also kidnaps Sharon Carter, who now knows that she is pregnant with Steve Rogers' child.

All of the Red Skull's actions benefit his puppet politician, Gordon Wright, who quickly becomes a popular third party Presidential candidate. Once elected, Wright will lead the country directly into a police state secretly controlled by the Red Skull.

The Skull also plans to transfer his consciousness into Sharon's unborn child, apparently sired by Steve Rogers himself and potentially having inherited his Project Rebirth enhancements.

Collected editions
The story arc is collected in three trade paperbacks and one Marvel Omnibus:

Captain America: The Death of Captain America, Vol. 1 – The Death of the Dream
Captain America: The Death of Captain America, Vol. 2 – The Burden of Dreams
Captain America: The Death of Captain America, Vol. 3 – The Man Who Bought America
Captain America: The Death of Captain America Omnibus

Reception
Captain America #25 which depicted Steve Rogers' death was the highest selling comic of March 2007 with preorder sales of 290,514 which was double the sales of the Mighty Avengers #1 in the same period. The Death of Captain America was reported in ABC News, by reporter Bryan Robinson.

Novel
The storyline was adapted into a novel by comics writer Larry Hama in March 2014 to tie in the release of Captain America: The Winter Soldier and features Sharon Carter, Bucky Barnes, Black Widow, and Falcon as central characters.

See also
Fallen Son: The Death of Captain America
Civil War
Captain America: Reborn

References

External links
Captain America Is Dead; National Hero Since 1941, New York Times

Captain America storylines
Comics by Ed Brubaker
Comics set in New York City